Barisal Divisional Stadium  (also known as Shaheed Abdur Rab Serniabad Stadium) is a multi-purpose stadium in Barisal, Bangladesh.  It is currently used mostly for football and cricket matches. The stadium holds 30,000 people.

History
The stadium hosted its first youth international cricket match between Bangladesh U-19 and Sri Lanka U-19 on 26 October 2019.

See also
 Stadiums in Bangladesh
 List of cricket grounds in Bangladesh
 List of international cricket grounds in Bangladesh

References

Cricket grounds in Bangladesh
Sports venues in Bangladesh